Burning Country is a 1921 German silent adventure film directed by Heinz Herald and starring Marie Wismar, Ernst Deutsch, and Kurt Vespermann. It premiered in Berlin on 10 March 1921.

Cast
 Marie Wismar as Frau Valevski
 Ernst Deutsch as Vikar Benedikt
 Kurt Vespermann as Karl
 Albert Steinrück as General Braticzek
 Maximiliane Ackers as Marie, Karls Braut
 John Gottowt as Wladislaus
 Lyda Salmonova as Mascha
 Geo Bergal as Heinrich
 Albert Bassermann
 Hugo Döblin
 Albrecht Viktor Blum

References

Bibliography
 Grange, William. Cultural Chronicle of the Weimar Republic. Scarecrow Press, 2008.

External links

1921 films
Films of the Weimar Republic
German silent short films
German adventure films
Films directed by Heinz Herald
German black-and-white films
1921 adventure films
Silent adventure films
1920s German films